The Lycée français international Louis-Massignon, previously Groupe Scolaire Louis Massignon, is a French international school in Casablanca, Morocco. It was established in 1996 and is part of the Mission laïque française OSUI network. It serves levels maternelle (preschool) through terminale, the final year of lycée (senior high school) and it allows French, English and Arabic languages learning from preschool for all children. As of 2017 the school has about 4,400 students range from 3 to 18 years in four different campuses: Bouskoura, Aïn Sebaâ, Mers Sultan, Val d'Anfa.

See also
 Agency for French Education Abroad
 Education in France
 International school
 List of international schools
 Mission laïque française
 Multilingualism
 Louis Massignon

References

External links
 
 

French international schools in Morocco
International schools in Casablanca
Trilingual schools
Cambridge schools in Morocco
Educational institutions established in 1996
1996 establishments in Morocco
AEFE contracted schools
Mission laïque française
20th-century architecture in Morocco